Yuny was also the name of a viceroy of Kush.
Yuny or Iuny was an official through the reign of Seti I, in the 19th Dynasty, serving as chief scribe of the court, the overseer of priests, and royal steward. His tomb at Deir Durunka, south of Asyut, portrays Yuny as an hereditary prince and a count. A life-sized statue of him was discovered in the tomb of his son. Another statue shows him alone offering a shrine with a figure of Osiris.

References

External links
Image and description of statue of Yuny and his wife. Metropolitan Museum of Art.

People of the Nineteenth Dynasty of Egypt
13th-century BC people
Ramesses II